Marcin Sapa (born February 10, 1976 in Konin) is a Polish road bicycle racer, who most recently rode for BDC-Marcpol team. He turned professional in 2000 and raced with smaller teams including DHL-Author before joining  for the 2009 and 2010 seasons.

Major results

2007
 1st Pomorski Klasyk
2008
 1st Dookoła Mazowsza
 1st Tour of Małopolska
2010
 1st Stage 5 Bayern-Rundfahrt
2011
 1st Overall Course de la Solidarité Olympique
1st Stage 3
2012
 2nd Overall Tour of Bulgaria
2013
 1st  Overall Dookoła Mazowsza
1st Stage 4 (TTT)
 1st Stage 4 Tour of Bulgaria
 1st  Combativity classification, Tour of Małopolska
 5th Puchar Ministra Obrony Narodowej

References

External links
Martin Sapa's profile on Cycling Base
LA SQUADRA
Marcin Sapa joins Lampre

1976 births
Living people
Polish male cyclists
People from Konin
Sportspeople from Greater Poland Voivodeship